Jack L. Stahl (June 28, 1934 – December 29, 2016) served as the 25th lieutenant governor of New Mexico and was an American businessman. Born in Lincoln, Illinois, he moved to New Mexico at 17 because of asthma and was Republican. Stahl earned an education degree at the University of New Mexico. From 1969 to 1970, he served in the New Mexico House of Representatives, and from 1981 to 1986 in the New Mexico Senate.

In 1976, Stahl and others secured all New Mexico delegates to support Ronald Reagan for President; in 1980, Stahl's work in New Hampshire, alongside his wife Carol, led to Reagan's primary victory in that state. Reagan's NH victory turned the primary tide in his favor. Many view Jack L. Stahl as a father of the modern conservative movement.

References

External links 
FamilyTreeMaker

1934 births
2016 deaths
American people of German descent
Lieutenant Governors of New Mexico
Republican Party members of the New Mexico House of Representatives
Republican Party New Mexico state senators
People from Lincoln, Illinois